Jakob Busk Jensen (born 12 September 1993) is a Danish footballer who plays as goalkeeper for Bundesliga club Union Berlin.

Club career

Denmark
Having played in their youth side for four years, Busk was promoted to the first team of F.C. Copenhagen during the 2012–13 season. He gained his first Superliga game on 16 May 2013, an away match against Randers FC. In the Autumn of 2014, Busk was sent out on loan to fellow Superliga club AC Horsens, and the following year had a spell with Sandefjord.

Union Berlin
Busk moved to German 2. Bundesliga side Union Berlin in January 2016.

Honours
Danish Superliga: 2012–13

References

External links
 
 National team profile 

1993 births
Living people
Footballers from Copenhagen
Association football goalkeepers
Danish men's footballers
Denmark youth international footballers
Denmark under-21 international footballers
Danish Superliga players
2. Bundesliga players
F.C. Copenhagen players
AC Horsens players
Eliteserien players
Sandefjord Fotball players
1. FC Union Berlin players
Danish expatriate men's footballers
Danish expatriate sportspeople in Norway
Expatriate footballers in Norway
Danish expatriate sportspeople in Germany
Expatriate footballers in Germany